Penny Casdagli (born 12 August 1948) is a Greek actress.

Early life

She was born Alexis Penny Casdagli to Alexis Theodore Casdagli (a former prisoner of war) and Winifred Wendy Casdagli (née Levrett), who both served in the Second World War as a Major and Captain respectively. After the war ended, they met whilst serving in Volos, marrying in 1947 and giving birth to their daughter the following year in the midst of the Greek Civil War. In 1949, Penny was christened Penelope Sherrie Casdagli in the bell of an upturned warship in the harbour. Legally, it was British soil, so her parents could get her a passport in case of an emergency exit from the war-torn country.

Acting

She trained as a dancer at the Arts Education School before studying at the Royal Central School of Speech and Drama. Her TV acting work includes Judge Dee, Jubilee, Doctor Who (1979's Destiny of the Daleks) and Grange Hill as well as playing 18-year-old heroin addict Trudi in 1971 film, Puppet on a Chain.

Personal life and Theatre

Whilst at theatre school, which was a girls’ boarding school, Casdagli discovered that she was a lesbian but kept it hidden. Despite this, she married Ian Giles in Newcastle in 1973. Over the years, Casdagli participated in pieces of lesbianism via various workshops, finding inspiration from the Women Live festival in 1980. By the 1980s, she decided to come out while touring in an Alan Ayckbourn play. The negative response from her colleagues caused Casdagli to give up acting.

Under the pen name Maro Green, she has written a number of plays, usually with a particular emphasis on lesbianism and the feminist movement. She has also written plays for young people, often with an emphasis on the use of sign language for the deaf.

In 1987, Casdagli received the British Drama Award for the Best Young People's Play for Pardon Mr Punch. That same year, she founded the theatre company Neti-Neti (The name being a Zen term for ‘not this and not that’) with Caroline Griffin but left in 1995 due to internal political reasons.

Nowadays, she is the director of publishers Cylix Press. With this company, she compiled and edited Prouder Than Ever: My War + My Diary + My Embroideries, the war diary of her father.

References

External links

Penny Casdagli at Theatricalia
Cylix Press

1948 births
Greek actresses
Living people
Greek emigrants to the United Kingdom
Alumni of the Royal Central School of Speech and Drama